Elrath is an unincorporated community in Cherokee County, Alabama, United States.

History
A post office called Elrath was in operation from 1892 until 1903. The community was named for Samuel McElrath, an early settler.

References

Unincorporated communities in Cherokee County, Alabama
Unincorporated communities in Alabama